The Barn at Croft Farm, Llantilio Crossenny, Monmouthshire is a remarkably rare example of a 16th-century barn. Originally built as part of the Great Tre-Rhew Estate, it is a Grade II* listing building.

History
The barn was constructed circa. 1550 as a corn barn. The barn's importance was noticed by Sir Cyril Fox and Lord Raglan who recorded it in their three-volume guide Monmouthshire Houses. By the 21st century, it was in a state of dereliction and on the Buildings at Risk register but is now in the process of being restored.

Architecture and description
The architectural historian John Newman describes Croft Farm Barn as "remarkable". The barn is cruck-framed with weatherboarding to the ground floor and with wattle panels above. The building materials are stone and timber. The barn is listed Grade II*, its listing record noting its "exceptionally rare (status) and fine carpentry".

Footnotes

References

References 
 

Grade II* listed buildings in Monmouthshire